Lucien Jefferson Agoumé (born 9 February 2002) is a French professional footballer who plays as a midfielder for  club Troyes, on loan from the Italian club Inter Milan.

Club career

Sochaux
Prior to joining Sochaux, Agoumé started his career with SC Clémenceau Besançon in 2013, and signed for Racing Besançon during the 2013–14 season. He arrived at FC Sochaux-Montbéliard in 2014. He made his professional debut on 19 October 2018. Sochaux won the game against Troyes by 2–1. He became the youngest player to debut in Sochaux. During the time he was playing for the club, other clubs such as Barcelona, Inter and Lyon were watching him. Most of the time, Agoumé played as a defensive midfielder. He can also be deployed as a central midfielder and an attacking midfielder. He showed good awareness and had good pinpoint passing and innovative vision. According to Agoumé's former head coach in Sochaux, Omar Daf, he is a player that improve in games. Before Agoumé was transferred to Inter, he has already made 15 appearances for Sochaux in Ligue 2 and one appearance in Coupe de France at the age of 17.

Inter Milan 
Inter Milan completed the transfer of Agoumé on 5 July 2019, with a total transfer fee of €4.5 million including add-ons. According to the statement, Agoumé had signed a three-year deal with Inter Milan. He was playing for the club's Primavera for the 2019–20 season. Inter Milan faced competitions from other clubs such as Barcelona and Lyon, when signing the player. According to Oscar Damiani, one of the intermediaries in the deal, Barcelona and Manchester City wanted to recruit Agoumé. According to Agoumé himself, he chose to join Inter, because the team believes a lot in him. His attributes made Inter to sign him during the summer transfer window, becoming a defensive midfielder with incredible tackle resistance. Fans compare Agoumé with Paul Pogba. Pogba has the same nationality and play the same position as Agoumé. Antonio Conte trained both of them before. So far, Agoumé has played for Inter's Primavera in Primavera 1 for five times (450 minutes) with one goal and one assist. He has four appearances for the Inter Milan UEFA U19 in the UEFA Youth League and had two assists. Agoumé's first appearance for Inter came in a pre-season friendly against Lugano. He made a substitute appearance and Inter finally won a 2–1. His Serie A debut came on 15 December 2019. He made a six minutes' substitute appearance in the 1-1 match against Fiorentina.

Loan to Spezia
On 24 September 2020, Agoumé joined Spezia on a season-long loan.

Loan to Brest
On 31 August 2021, Agoumé joined Ligue 1 club Brest on a season-long loan.

Loan to Troyes
On 1 September 2022, Agoumé was loaned to Troyes.

International career
Agoumé was born in Cameroon, but also has French nationality. Before he became an adult, he trained for many years on different French teams. The French national team has a long history and was the 1998 World Cup champion. So far, he has played in international competitions for the French U16, U17 and U18 youth teams. His U16 debut came on 5 May 2018, and scored two goals in four games. As a defensive midfielder, his efficiency has brought attention from clubs around the world. Five months later, he jumped into the French U17 youth team and scored four goals in 23 international matches.

On 20 August 2019, Agoumé made his debut for the French U18 youth team. Right now, he is also the captain of the team. In 2019, he scored a goal each against Paraguay U18 and Senegal U17. So far, he has made 11 appearances for the U18 team and got four goals.

FIFA U-17 World Cup
Agoumé participated in the U17 World Cup with the team as the team's captain. He scored a goal in the U17 World Cup group match against Chile on 27 October 2019. He played for the team six times throughout the tournament, five of which were captains, leading the team to third place in the tournament. His performance made him be ranked among the top ten notable players in the tournament by FIFA. His physical condition and passing skills make him be noticed by fans. After a 3–2 lost to Brazil in the tournament, where Agoumé was unable to make an appearance because of the suspension, the coach Jean-Claude Giuntini admitted that Agoumé is an important player for the team. His teammate, Nathanael Mbuku, said during the interview that Agoumé's absence was detrimental. He also said in the interview that 'He's the captain and he's a player who can put his stamp on a game. He's someone we needed.'

Personal life
Agoumé is a supporter of Marseille.

Career statistics

Club

Honours 
France U17
 FIFA U-17 World Cup third place: 2019

Individual
 UEFA European Under-17 Championship Team of the Tournament: 2019
Maurice Revello Tournament Best XI: 2022

References

External links
 
 
 
 

2002 births
Living people
Footballers from Yaoundé
French footballers
France youth international footballers
Association football midfielders
FC Sochaux-Montbéliard players
Ligue 1 players
Ligue 2 players
Championnat National 3 players
Inter Milan players
Spezia Calcio players
Stade Brestois 29 players
ES Troyes AC players
Serie A players
French expatriate footballers
Expatriate footballers in Italy
French expatriate sportspeople in Italy
Cameroonian emigrants to France